Mone Mone is a 1989 Bengali film directed by Partha Pratim Chowdhury and music composed by Kanu Bhattacharya.

Release
Released on January 1, 1989, the film is in Bengali language.

Cast
 Satabdi Roy
 Prosenjit Chatterjee
 Nirmal Kumar
 Subhendu Chatterjee
 Satya Bandyopadhyay

References

External links

Bengali-language Indian films
Indian romance films
1989 films
1980s Bengali-language films